Aidu Nature Reserve is a nature reserve in Põltsamaa and Pajusi, Jõgeva County. The area is 3.16 km². It was established in October 2016.

References 

Nature reserves in Estonia
Geography of Jõgeva County